New Jersey State Normal School may refer to:

Schools
The College of New Jersey
Kean University, named New Jersey State Normal School at Newark from 1913 to 1937
Montclair State University, named New Jersey State Normal School at Montclair from 1908 to 1927
New Jersey City University, named New Jersey State Normal School at Jersey City from 1929 to 1935